The enzyme trichodiene synthase (EC 4.2.3.6) catalyzes the chemical reaction

(2E,6E)-farnesyl diphosphate  trichodiene + diphosphate

This enzyme belongs to the family of lyases, specifically those carbon-oxygen lyases acting on phosphates.  The systematic name of this enzyme class is (2E,6E)-farnesyl-diphosphate diphosphate-lyase (cyclizing, trichodiene-forming). Other names in common use include trichodiene synthetase, sesquiterpene cyclase, and trans,trans-farnesyl-diphosphate sesquiterpenoid-lyase.  This enzyme participates in terpenoid biosynthesis.

Structural studies

References

 

EC 4.2.3
Enzymes of known structure